Frauds and Frenzies is a 1918 American silent comedy film featuring Stan Laurel.

Cast
 Larry Semon as Larry, First Prisoner
 Stan Laurel as Simp, Second Prisoner
 Madge Kirby as Dolly Dare
 William McCall as Warden (as Billy McCall)
 William Hauber as Prison guard (as Bill Hauber)

See also
 List of American films of 1918

References

External links

1918 films
1918 comedy films
1918 short films
American silent short films
Silent American comedy films
American black-and-white films
Films directed by Larry Semon
American comedy short films
1910s American films